Cold Day Memory is the eighth studio album by American rock band Sevendust, released on April 20, 2010. The album marks the return of guitarist Clint Lowery who previously left Sevendust in 2004 to work with Dark New Day. The album debuted at No. 12 on the Billboard 200, selling about 27,000 copies in the United States in its first week of release, marking the band's highest debut ever.

Recording and production
In October 2009, Sevendust began recording a new album at Groovemaster Studios in Chicago, Illinois with producer Johnny K. Clint Lowery's brother, Corey Lowery who had previously worked with Clint Lowery in the band Dark New Day,  also aided the band in their recording process. Stepping out of the box from regular recording sessions the band showed the fans how the album was created, with virtually every step of the process being chronicled through a series of video blogs, which were posted on the revamped official site and accompanying YouTube channel. These near-daily "vlogs" that the band posted on the site consisted of updates on the progress of the new album, as well as footage of the band mates living in the new "house" in which they were recording from. On January 20, 2010, drummer Morgan Rose revealed that the album title was Cold Day Memory.

Guitarist Clint Lowery, who rejoined Sevendust in March 2008, commented, "This record personally has been one of the most difficult, but most rewarding records I've ever worked on. I put a lot of pressure on myself to contribute good material to the guys after being gone for last three records and that helped me focus more than I ever had." Added Witherspoon, "I feel this album shows new growth for the band. We're very happy to have Clint back and are looking forward for everyone hearing the magic that's made when we're all together!"

Lyrical themes
Rose described the writing process for the album as "a more personal experience to him", and said that due to the events that transpired in the prior year, he would sometimes have trouble coming up with words, and would often write gibberish as a temporary filler. While Rose would be the primary writer, all five members of the band would contribute. Rose focused on more distressing themes, while Witherspoon, who had just become a father, focused his lyrics on responsibility and commitment. The album's first single, "Unraveling", was co-written by Lowery and is about the collapse of a relationship, while "Confession" indirectly addresses Lowery quitting and returning to the band. On Lowery's return, Rose spoke "Since we all write, it's hard to tell exactly what each song is about, but we like to leave it up to the listeners to decide for themselves," Rose says. "It's funny because in the end you almost don't know what you wrote. I remember telling John one time, 'Dude, that was an amazing line you wrote,' and he went, 'What are you talking about? You wrote that.' We wanted to change the template completely from what we did with our last album, 'Hope And Sorrow'. We were going, 'Let's bring back those other elements Clint brought in that made us what we were.' So we sort of made a silent agreement that we were going to let Clint run wild. We said we'll jump in when it's time, but if you've got an idea let's go with it."

During the recording process, the band would leave the studio to perform several shows, and then return afterwards; a process that Lowery was initially against at first. Witherspoon commented it was "a tedious process."

Release
On December 22, 2009, the band announced that the tracking for the album was complete, and was in the mixing process for an April 2010 release. In between and after this, they performed a few shows over December and early January.

On January 31, 2010, Sevendust posted this on their official website: "It's getting close to time to previewing a new song for all of you. Keep an eye out this week and next for a new song that we will post for everyone that has been waiting. We wanted to release a preview to the hardcore fans that have been with us, and give you a taste of what's to come. Still putting together the final touches, but the second the song is ready we'll have it up for all to hear. We want you to have something fresh to listen to gear up for the new tour coming in February."

The second single "Forever" (then titled "Forever Dead") was made available for streaming on the band's official MySpace page and YouTube account on February 5, 2010. That same day, "Unraveling" made its debut on Sirius XM's Octane station. The track "Forever" was made available for purchase on the iTunes Store on March 30, 2010.

It wasn't until recently that Sevendust began streaming their entire album over the radio. With the exception of "Better Place", every other song received some playing time on local rock stations. On April 18, 2010, the album was leaked on various P2P networks and file sharing sites.

Track listing

Reception

Reception to Cold Day Memory was quite positive. 411mania.com stated "What you'll find here is the best Sevendust album since Seasons in terms of lyrics, emotion, guitarwork and drums." ultimate-guitar.com stated "At times the band broaches the industrial genre, but those moments are extremely fleeting. In both "Splinter" and "Forever Dead", the intros feature computer-like effects that could easily have led into NIN territory." Chris Colgan of PopMatters focused on the significance of Clint Lowery's return to the band, saying that "...the reunion with Lowery immediately proves to be a huge step forward for the veteran quintet." Colgan goes on to say that the album "...has the energy and vitality of the band's older work, but it also has exponentially greater musicianship and subtlety, the kind that only a veteran band can achieve."

The album did receive some level of criticism, though. thenewreview.net stated "With songs like 'Ride Insane' 'Here and Now' and 'Nowhere', I became a little bored. I felt as if I were listening to songs I had already heard before by the band, or perhaps even elsewhere, and wasn't completely blown away by what was there."  Guitarinternational.com stated "Cold Day Memory is a killer release, and one that should act to propel the band into the new decade with a renewed sense of confidence, hopefully forgetting, at least somewhat, the events that haunted them for the majority of the past decade. If this record is any indication of things to come, then we could be hearing great things from a band that has more than paid their dues, and come screaming back onto the scene, leaving no doubt that they deserve to be included next to the biggest names in Metal today."

Personnel
Sevendust
Lajon Witherspoon - lead vocals
Clint Lowery - lead guitar, backing vocals
John Connolly - rhythm guitar, backing vocals
Vinnie Hornsby - bass
Morgan Rose - drums, backing vocals

Production
Ted Jensen - mastering
Johnny K - producer, mixing
Justin Walden - programming

Charts
Album

Singles

References

Sevendust albums
2010 albums
Asylum Records albums
Albums produced by Johnny K